Sam Adkins (born 3 December 1991) is a footballer who plays as a midfielder, most recently for Southern League club Stratford Town.

Playing career

Walsall
Adkins made his Walsall debut on 17 January 2009 in the Football League One clash with Peterborough United at London Road, which ended in a 1–0 loss. In January 2010, Adkins joined Hednesford Town on loan, scoring one goal in four league appearances before returning to Walsall.

He and six other players were released by Walsall on 10 May 2010.

Stratford Town
Adkins joined Tividale on loan from Stratford Town on 9 October 2015 on a months loan.

References

External links

1991 births
Living people
Footballers from Birmingham, West Midlands
English footballers
Association football midfielders
Walsall F.C. players
Hednesford Town F.C. players
Solihull Moors F.C. players
Leamington F.C. players
Redditch United F.C. players
Evesham United F.C. players
Stratford Town F.C. players
Tividale F.C. players
English Football League players
National League (English football) players